Cadegliano-Viconago is a comune (municipality) in the Province of Varese in the Italian region Lombardy, located about  northwest of Milan and about  north of Varese, on the border with Switzerland.

Cadegliano-Viconago borders the following municipalities: Cremenaga, Croglio (Switzerland), Cugliate-Fabiasco, Lavena Ponte Tresa, Marchirolo, Marzio, Monteggio (Switzerland), Montegrino Valtravaglia.

Cadegliano-Viconago is the birthplace of Gian Carlo Menotti, two-time winner of the Pulitzer Prize.

Demographic evolution

References

Cities and towns in Lombardy